Xenothictis oncodes is a species of moth of the family Tortricidae. It is found in New Caledonia in the southwest Pacific Ocean. The habitat consists of rainforests.

The wingspan is 24–37 mm. The forewings are grey, sprinkled, suffused and reticulate (net-like pattern) with purple brown. The markings are darker than the strigulation (fine streaks). The hindwings are grey brown, suffused and strigulated with brown.

References

Moths described in 2013
Archipini